Aéroport Charles de Gaulle 2 TGV station (French: Gare de l'aéroport Charles-de-Gaulle 2 TGV) is a major passenger railway station in Tremblay-en-France, France. It is directly beneath terminal two of Paris Charles de Gaulle Airport (between the C/D and E/F concourses) and is operated by the SNCF. The station was opened in November 1994 by President François Mitterrand. It connects the airport to Paris and to various other cities in France, as well as to Belgium.

In 2019, 15.2 million passenger movements were made through the station.

Train services
Both TGV and RER B trains stop at the station, and it is a terminus of the RER B (B3). The station is situated on the LGV Interconnexion Est and TGV trains from the station go to Angers, Besançon, Bordeaux, Dijon, Le Mans, Lille, Lyon, Marseille, Montpellier, Nantes, Poitiers, Rennes, Strasbourg and Tours.

The RER line B offers a connection to the centre of Paris, a journey of approximately 30 minutes.

Gallery

References

External links 

 
 

Railway stations in Seine-Saint-Denis
Airport railway stations in France
Charles de Gaulle Airport
Railway stations in France opened in 1994